Dagmar Ziegler (born 28 September 1960) is a German politician of the Social Democratic Party (SPD) who served as a member of the Bundestag from the state of Brandenburg from 2009 until 2021.

Political career

Career in state politics 
From 1994 until 2009, Ziegler was a member of the State Parliament of Brandenburg. In the government of Minister-President Matthias Platzeck, she served as State Minister of Finance (2000-2004) and State Minister for Labour, Social Affairs, Health and Families (2004-2009).

Member of the German Parliament, 2009–2021 
Ziegler became a member of the Bundestag after the 2009 German federal election. From 2009 until 2013, she was Member of the Bundestag FOR Prignitz – Ostprignitz-Ruppin – Havelland I in north-western Brandenburg State, and served as deputy chairwoman of the SPD parliamentary group under the leadership of chairman Frank-Walter Steinmeier. 

She lost her constituency in 2013 to Sebastian Steineke from the CDU, but was elected on the state list. 

In the negotiations to form a Grand Coalition of Chancellor Angela Merkel's Christian Democrats (CDU together with the Bavarian CSU) and the SPD following the 2013 federal elections, Ziegler was part of her party's delegation in the working group on families, women and equality, led by Annette Widmann-Mauz and Manuela Schwesig.

From 2014, Ziegler served on the parliament’s Council of Elders, which – among other duties – determines daily legislative agenda items and assigns committee chairpersons based on party representation. In 2018, she also joined the Committee on Economic Cooperation and Development.

Ziegler contested the same constituency in 2017, but failed. She returned to the Bundestag on the list. 

In December 2019, Ziegler announced that she would not stand in the 2021 federal elections but instead resign from active politics by the end of the parliamentary term. In her final year in parliament, she serves as the parliament's vice-president, following the sudden death of Thomas Oppermann.

Other activities 
 Deutsche Gesellschaft für Internationale Zusammenarbeit (GIZ), Member of the Board of Trustees

References

External links 

  
 Bundestag biography 

1960 births
Living people
Members of the Bundestag for Brandenburg
Ministers of the Brandenburg State Government
Female members of the Bundestag
21st-century German women politicians
Members of the Bundestag 2017–2021
Members of the Bundestag 2013–2017
Members of the Bundestag 2009–2013
Members of the Bundestag for the Social Democratic Party of Germany
Recipients of the Cross of the Order of Merit of the Federal Republic of Germany